Syria (SYR) competed at the 1991 Mediterranean Games in Athens, Greece. The medal tally was 11.

Nations at the 1991 Mediterranean Games
1991
Mediterranean Games